Snyders, or Snyder's, may refer to:

Snyders, Pennsylvania
Snyder's of Hanover, pretzel manufacturer in Hanover, Pennsylvania
Snyder's-Lance, parent company of the combined Snyder's and Lance food companies
Snyder of Berlin, potato chip manufacturer near Berlin, Pennsylvania, a division of Birds Eye foods
Snyders (surname)

See also
Snijders
Snyder (disambiguation)